US Post Office-Great Neck is a historic post office building located at Great Neck Plaza in the town of North Hempstead, Nassau County, New York, United States. It was built in 1939 and designed by consulting architect William Dewey Foster (1890-1958) for the Office of the Supervising Architect.  It is a one-story, pentagonal shaped skeletal frame building clad with plucked textured buff limestone in the Classical Revival style. It features a semicircular entrance portico supported by four square columns.  Above the entrance is a relief sculpture of an eagle with 13 stars sculpted in 1940 by Gaetano Cecere.

It was listed on the National Register of Historic Places in 1989. It was designated as a local historical landmark on December 1, 2004.

References

Great Neck
Government buildings completed in 1935
Neoclassical architecture in New York (state)
Great Neck Peninsula
National Register of Historic Places in North Hempstead (town), New York